Glycitin (glycitein 7-O-glucoside) is an isoflavone found in soy, and remains to various degrees in soy products like tofu, soymilk and soy sauce.  Although glycitin has its own health associated properties (below), it can be transformed to glycitein by human intestinal flora by the action of beta-glucosidases.

Properties
Some interesting effects of glycitin include human dermal fibroblast cell proliferation and migration via TGF‐β signaling, glycitin treatment produces anti-photoaging effects such as collagen type I and collagen type III increase at both the mRNA and protein levels.  Other noted effects  decreased elastase, and decreased β‐galactosidase activation.  In conjunction with 4′,6,7-trimethoxyisoflavone (TMF), an isoflavone that promotes fibroblast migration but not proliferation, wound healing and anti-scarring activity (reorganization and wound fibrosis inhibition) were significantly and synergistically boosted in both in vivo mice and in vitro.

References 

Glucosides
Isoflavones